Vasilios Kravaritis (born 3 April 2002) is a Greek professional footballer who plays as a goalkeeper for Super League 2 club Kallithea.

Honours
Volos
Football League: 2018–19

References

2002 births
Living people
Greek footballers
Gamma Ethniki players
Football League (Greece) players
Super League Greece players
Volos N.F.C. players
Association football goalkeepers
Footballers from Volos